Isilo (c. 1956 – 2014) was one of South Africa’s largest African elephants and the largest living tusker in the southern hemisphere before his death. He was known as a tusker, a male elephant with tusks weighing over 100 pounds.

Although Isilo died of natural causes relating to old age, his death attracted international media attention because his tusks, considered a National Heritage artifact, were missing when his body was discovered.

Background
Isilo was an African elephant that lived in Tembe Elephant Park in South Africa, home to some of the largest elephants in the world. Isilo’s name means “King” in Zulu.

Born during the late 1950s, he was estimated to have been at least 58 years old when he died.

Isilo weighed about 6.5 tonnes to 7 tonnes. Isilo's tusks were estimated to be more than 3 meters (9 feet) long. The right tusk weighed about 65 kg (143 pounds) and the left about 60 kg (132 pounds).

Isilo was a major attraction at the Tembe Elephant Park due to his immense size and his placid gentle nature. He was world-famous and even had his own Facebook page with thousands of followers.

Death
Isilo died of natural causes in an area known to be his home range in a southwest section of the park around 10 January 2014. His carcass was discovered in late March 2014 and his death was announced on April 4, 2014 by Ezemvelo KZN Wildlife and Ernest Robbertse, Manager of the Tembe Elephant Park Lodge.

His tusks were missing and had been removed one after the other over a period of two weeks. They had most likely been taken by suspected rhino poachers and transported over the border into Mozambique where tusks are shipped to the Far East, the world's biggest market for ivory.

Isilo's tusks were estimated to have a black market value of approximately R3 million (about $250,000. US).

Reactions to the death 
Isilo's death resulted in international media attention due to his celebrity status and the loss of his tusks, considered a National Heritage artifact.

Isilo's tusks were the heritage of the Tembe clan, part owners and ancestral custodians of the Tembe Elephant Park. Inkosi Mabhudu Tembe, chief of the Tembe clan, planned to offer the tusks to South Africa for display at the King Shaka Airport in Durban to promote tourism. In April 2014, Inkosi Tembe offered a R100 000 (approx $8600 US) reward for the return of the missing tusks.

Other large tuskers
In Tsavo East National Park in Kenya in June 2014, Satao the biggest tusker in East Africa – with ivory as big as Isilo's – was killed by poachers with poisoned spears.

Books and other media
Isilo is acknowledged in two books by Dr. Johan Marais, who believes that the largest elephants in the world can be found in the Tembe National Elephant Park:
 Marais, Johan (2008) Great Tuskers of Africa Penguin Global 
 Marais, Johan (2011) In Search of Africa’s Great Tuskers Penguin Global 

James Currie, international wildlife expert, was the last person to film Isilo before his disappearance. In 2016, he launched a Kickstarter campaign to film Last of the Big Tuskers a documentary about the largest elephants on earth and what is being done to ensure their survival. The documentary was released in October 2018.

See also
 Elephant hunting in Kenya
 List of individual elephants

References

Individual elephants
Individual wild animals
African bush elephant
Mammals of Sub-Saharan Africa
Species endangered by habitat fragmentation
Herbivorous mammals
Vulnerable animals
Vulnerable biota of Africa